The Mischabel Hut (German: Mischabelhütte) is a mountain hut of the Academic Alpine Club of Zurich, located west of Saas Fee in the canton of Valais.

The hut is accessible to experienced hikers from Saas Fee (4 hours), with a marked trail and fixed ropes. The Mischabel Hut is used to climb the Lenzspitze, the Nadelhorn and the Hohberghorn.

See also
List of buildings and structures above 3000 m in Switzerland

References
Swisstopo topographic maps

External links

Mountain huts in Switzerland
Buildings and structures in Valais
Mountain huts in the Alps